HMS Stirling Castle was a 70-gun third rate ship of the line of the Royal Navy, built at Chatham Dockyard and launched on 21 September 1705.

On 12 March 1720 orders were issued directing her to be taken to pieces and rebuilt according to the 1719 Establishment at Woolwich, from where she was relaunched on 23 April 1723.

Stirling Castle was converted into a hulk in 1739, and continued to serve in that role until 1771, when she was broken up.

Notes

References

Lavery, Brian (2003) The Ship of the Line – Volume 1: The development of the battlefleet 1650–1850. Conway Maritime Press. .

External links

Ships of the line of the Royal Navy
1700s ships